Erich Schmidt (27 February 1925 – 24 September 2009) was a German wrestler. He competed in the men's Greco-Roman lightweight at the 1952 Summer Olympics, representing Saar.

References

External links
 

1925 births
2009 deaths
German male sport wrestlers
Olympic wrestlers of Saar
Wrestlers at the 1952 Summer Olympics
People from Völklingen
Sportspeople from Saarland